Monterey is a U.S. city on California's Central Coast in Monterey County on the southern edge of Monterey Bay.

Monterey may also refer to:

Places

Australia
 Monterey, New South Wales
 Monterey, Mosman a heritage-listed residential building

Canada
Monterey Park, Calgary, Alberta, a neighbourhood

United States
 Monterey AVA, a California wine region in Monterey County
 Monterey County, California
 Monterey Park, California
 Monterey (Odessa, Delaware), a historic house
 Monterey, Indiana
 Monterey, Kentucky
 Monterey, Louisiana
 Monterey, Massachusetts
 Monterey, Michigan
 Monterey, Mississippi
 Monterey, Missouri
 Monterey, Nebraska
 Monterey, Clermont County, Ohio
 Monterey, Mercer County, Ohio
 Monterey, Roanoke, Virginia, a neighborhood
 Monterey, Tennessee
 Monterey, Virginia, in Highland County
 Monterey (Roanoke, Virginia), a historic plantation house
 Monterey, Wisconsin

Ships
 , a screw tug that operated in San Francisco Bay from 1863 to 1892
 , an armored monitor in service from 1893 to 1921
 , a light aircraft carrier of World War II, serving from 1943 to 1956
 , a guided missile cruiser commissioned in 1990 and currently in active service
 SS Monterey, a 1931 Matson Lines passenger ship
 , a passenger and freight ship
 Monterey, a Type C4-class ship

Other 
 Battle of Monterey, 1846
 Mercury Monterey, a full-size car produced by Mercury from 1950 to 1974, and a minivan based on the Ford Freestar produced from 2004 to 2007
 Monterey Formation, an extensive oil-rich geological formation of California
 Monterey Jack, a type of cheese
 Monterey Jazz Festival, an annual music festival that started in 1958
 Monterey Pop Festival, a music festival that was held in 1967
 Project Monterey, a failed UNIX software development effort
 "Monterey" (Eric Burdon and the Animals song), a song by Eric Burdon & The Animals
 "Monterey" (Dean Brody song), a song by Dean Brody
 macOS Monterey, the 2021 release of Apple's desktop operating system macOS
 Holden Monterey, a SUV by now-defunct automobile Holden

See also

 Monterey Township (disambiguation)
 Monterrey (disambiguation)
Monterrei